Striborg is a black metal / ambient project of Australian musician Russell Menzies. The project first began in 1994 under the name Kathaaria and during this time the stage name "Vvelkaarn" was used. The name Kathaaria was adapted from a Darkthrone song titled "Kathaarian Life Code".

Three full-length albums were released as Kathaaria; one each year from 1995 to 1997. Following the release of the third album, Menzies grew dissatisfied with the direction of the project and the first album under the name "Striborg" was released later that year. With this change, he also adopted the new stage name "Sin Nanna".

From 1997 the Striborg sound solidified around a singular lo-fi black metal style combined with ambient pieces, with all instruments and vocals primarily recorded by Menzies at his home. Releases were prodigious - often two or more per year. Formal releases were initially on the Asguard and Finsternis labels, moving to Displeased and Southern Lord Records as international recognition grew.

In 2018 Striborg moved away from black metal with the release of Blackwave, a full-length LP in a dark ambient/new wave style. Menzies announced that he intended to pursue this musical direction on future releases. His live performances after the release of Blackwave increased and showcased this new synthesiser-heavy style. More recently, he has returned to Black Metal, but without use of electric guitar.

Menzies' lyrics reveal a fascination with forests, darkness, night, misanthropy and death. The names "Striborg" and "Sin Nanna" are the names of a Slavonic wind god (of which the correct spelling is "Stribog") and Mesopotamian moon god, respectively.

Line-up
Sin Nanna – All instruments and vocals

Discography
Note: asterisk (*) indicates that the album has been re-released.

Compilations
2003: A Tragic Journey... / Through the Forest...
2003: Isle de Morts / Cold Winter Moon
2003: Misanthropic Isolation / In the Heart of the Rainforest*
2003: Nocturnal Emissions / Nyctophobia*
2004: 10 Years of Roaming the Forests (94-04)
2006: Misanthropic Isolation - Roaming the Forests
2008: In the Heart of the Rainforest / Through the Forest to Spiritual Enlightenment
2016: Purifying the River of Tears

Albums
1995: A Tragic Journey Towards the Light (as Kathaaria)
1996: Through the Forest to Spiritual enlightenment (as Kathaaria)
1997: Isle de Morts (as Kathaaria)
1997: Cold Winter Moon
1998: Misanthropic Isolation*
2000: In the Heart of the Rainforest
2004: Spiritual Catharsis*
2004: Mysterious Semblance*
2005: Black Desolate Winter / Depressive Hibernation*
2005: Trepidation*
2006: Embittered Darkness
2006: Nefaria
2007: Ghostwoodlands
2007: Solitude
2008: Autumnal Melancholy
2008: Foreboding Silence
2009: Perceiving The World With Hate
2009: Southwest Passage
2015: This Suffocating Existence
2016: Spiritual Deprivation
2017: A Procession of Lost Souls
2017: Instrumental Trans-Communication
2018: Blackwave
2019: Leave the World Behind
2019: An Existential Burden
2019: In Deep Contemplation
2020: Unknown Entities
2022: Lost in Between Worlds

Singles
2019: "A Perpetual Struggle of Restless Minds"
2019: "Dead Inside (Blackwave Version)"

Split releases
2007: "The Epitome of Misanthropy" (with Xasthur)
2007: "Psychedelic Nightmare" (with Scurshahor)
2009: "Florestas de Perpétua Solidão" (with Defuntos)
2009: "Black Hatred in a Ghostly Corner" (with Claustrophobia)
2010: "This Empty Coil" (with Vardan)
2018: "Spectral Shadows" (with Abigorum)
2019: "Striborg / Bosc Fosc / Drakonhail"

Videography
2007: Journey of a Misanthrope

Live shows
In May 2007, Sunn O))) did a Pacific Rim tour with a guest lineup consisting of Oren Ambarchi and Attila Csihar. However upon their arrival in Melbourne, Australia they joined with Sin Nanna for an improvisational performance. The makeshift group took up the name Pentemple and released one live album titled "0))) Presents...".

In January 2014, Striborg played live in the MONA FOMA music festival playing a new song titled "Purifying the River of Tears".

In June 2014, Sin Nanna performed live as Veil of Darkness for the first time supporting Sunn O))) as part of the Dark MOFO festival. He also played an unannounced set as Striborg on the final night of the festival.

Interviews
Until 2010, contact with Sin Nanna has been limited to online interviews on various blogs and fanzine sites conducted via email. Despite Sin Nanna's very anti social and misanthropic view of society, he agreed to take part in the 2010 Vice documentary One Man Metal, in which he further proved his eccentric lifestyle.

References

Australian black metal musical groups
Australian heavy metal musical groups
Musical groups established in 1994
Southern Lord Records artists
One-man bands